California is the most populous and third largest U.S. state by area, located on the West Coast of the United States. According to the 2010 United States Census, California's population is 37,253,956 and has  of land.

California is divided into 58 counties and contains 1,043 census designated-places (CDPs) (1,034 as of 2017). San Francisco is a consolidated city–county, which means that San Francisco County does not contain any CDPs.

The census-designated places in this list have a population of 10,000 or higher. Eastvale, Glen Avon, Mira Loma, Pedley, and Rubidoux have incorporated since the 2010 Census and thus are omitted from this list.



Census-Designated Places

See also 

List of counties in California
List of communities in California

References 

Cities